Debra is a community development block that forms an administrative division in the Kharagpur subdivision of Paschim Medinipur district in the Indian state of West Bengal.

History

Naxalite movement in Debra-Gopiballavpur
In 1968 many revolutionary intellectuals, broadly termed as Naxalites, settled in Gopiballavpur. Amongst them was Santosh Rana, who was a local person. In September 1969 a guerrilla squad killed an oppressive landlord. The landlords fled to the towns and a big peasant movement began. Landlords’ crops were forcibly harvested. Around 150 people were killed. Santosh Rana was the key figure in virtually “liberating” Debra, Gopiballavpur and neighbouring areas in West Bengal, as well as in Odisha and Jharkhand (then it was Bihar). The movement gradually split and collapsed in the early seventies.

Geography

Debra CD block is largely a flood prone marshy wetland. In this block 100% of the cultivated area has highly productive alluvial soil.

Debra CD block is bounded by Daspur I CD block in the north, Panskura CD block, in Purba Medinipur district, in the east, Pingla CD block in the south and Kharagpur II and Keshpur CD blocks in the west.

It is located 28 km from Midnapore, the district headquarters.

Debra CD block has an area of 342.41 km2. It has 1 panchayat samity, 14 gram panchayats, 214 gram sansads (village councils), 477 mouzas and 460 inhabited villages. Debra police station serves this block. Headquarters of this CD block is at Balichak.

Debra CD block had a forest cover of 540 hectares, against a total geographical area of 34,231 hectares in 2005-06.

Gram panchayats of Debra block/ panchayat samiti are: Bhabanipur, Bharatpur, Debra I, Debra II, Duan I, Duan II, Golgram, Jalimanda, Khanamohan, Malighati, Radhamohanpur I, Radhamohanpur II, Satyapur and Snarpur Lowada.

Demographics

Population
According to the 2011 Census of India, Debra CD block had a total population of 288,619, of which 274,835 were rural and 13,784 were urban. There were 145,559 (50%) males and 143,060 (50%) females. Population in the age range 0–6 years was 31,859. Scheduled Castes numbered 37,503 (12.99%) and Scheduled Tribes numbered 59,122 (20.48%).

As per 2001 census, Debra block had a total population of 255,196, out of which 129,109 were males and 126,087 were females. Debra block registered a population growth of 15.80 per cent during the 1991-2001 decade. Decadal growth for the combined Midnapore district was 14.87 per cent. Decadal growth in West Bengal was 17.45 per cent.

Census Towns in Debra CD block are (2011 census figures in brackets): Balichak (13,784).

Large villages (with 4,000+ population) in Debra CD block are (2011 census figures in brackets): Baragar (4,329).

Other villages in Debra CD block include (2011 census figures in brackets): Debra (2,347), Bhawanipur (1,700), Bharatpur (826), Golgram (3,984), Malighati (2,379), Satyapur (3,091), Jalimanda (2,263), Duan (3,497), Radhamohanpur (3,604), Khana Mohan (559), Shanrpur (1,252), Loyada (1,520) and Chak Bajit (560).

Literacy
As per the 2011 census the total number of literates in Debra CD block was 210,618 (82.03% of the population over 6 years) out of which males numbered 114,992 (88.78% of the male population over 6 years) and females numbered 95,626 (75.16% of the female population over 6 years). The gender gap in literacy rates was 13.62%.

Language and religion
According to the District Census Handbook, Paschim Medinipur, 2011 census, as of 2001, Bengali was the mother-tongue of 90.5% of the population of Paschim Medinipur district, followed by Santali (4.6%), Hindi (1.4%), Kurmali Thar (0.7%), Urdu (0.6%), Telugu (0.6%), Odia (0.4%), Mundari (0.2%), Koda/ Kora (0.1%), Munda (0.1%) and Nepali (0.1%). There were people, forming lesser proportion of population, having other languages as mother-tongue. People with other mother-tongues formed 0.7% of the population.

According to the West Bengal Official Language Act 1961 and the West Bengal Official Language (Amendment Act) 2012, the Bengali language is to be used for official purposes in the whole of West Bengal. In addition to Bengali, the Nepali language is to be used for official purposes in the three hills subdivisions, namely Darjeeling, Kalimpong and Kurseong, in the district of Darjeeling, and Urdu is to be used for official purposes in district/subdivision/ block/ municipality where the population speaking Urdu exceeds 10% of the total population.  The English language will continue to be used for official purposes as it was being used prior to the enactment of these laws.

The West Bengal Official Language (Second Amendment) Bill, 2012, included Hindi, Santhali, Odiya and Punjabi as official languages if it is spoken by a population exceeding 10 per cent of the whole in a particular block or sub-division or a district.  Subsequently, Kamtapuri, Rajbanshi and Kurmali were also included in the list of minority languages by the West Bengal Official Language (Second Amendment) Bill, 2018. However, as of 2020, there is no official / other reliable information about the areas covered. Census 2011 provides language data only at the district and above level.

In the 2011 census Hindus formed 88.16% and Muslims formed 10.34% of the population. Others including Addi Bassi, Marang Boro, Santal, Saranath, Sari Dharma, Sarna, Alchchi, Bidin, Sant, Saevdharm, Seran, Saran, Sarin, Kheria, Christian and other religious communities. formed 1.50% of the population.

BPL families
In Debra CD block 37.37% families were living below poverty line in 2007.

According to the District Human Development Report of Paschim Medinipur: The 29 CD blocks of the district were classified into four categories based on the poverty ratio. Nayagram, Binpur II and Jamboni CD blocks have very high poverty levels (above 60%). Kharagpur I, Kharagpur II, Sankrail, Garhbeta II, Pingla and Mohanpur CD blocks have high levels of poverty (50-60%), Jhargram, Midnapore Sadar, Dantan I, Gopiballavpur II, Binpur I, Dantan II, Keshiari, Chandrakona I, Gopiballavpur I, Chandrakona II, Narayangarh, Keshpur, Ghatal, Sabang, Garhbeta I, Salboni, Debra and Garhbeta III CD blocks have moderate levels of poverty (25-50%) and Daspur II and Daspur I CD blocks have low levels of poverty (below 25%).

Economy

Infrastructure
458 or 96% of mouzas in Debra CD block were electrified by 31 March 2014. 
 
473 mouzas in Debra CD block had drinking water facilities in 2013-14. There were 84 fertiliser depots, 36 seed stores and 37 fair price shops in the CD block.

Agriculture

Although the Bargadari Act of 1950 recognised the rights of bargadars to a higher share of crops from the land that they tilled, it was not implemented fully. Large tracts, beyond the prescribed limit of land ceiling, remained with the rich landlords. From 1977 onwards major land reforms took place in West Bengal. Land in excess of land ceiling was acquired and distributed amongst the peasants. Following land reforms land ownership pattern has undergone transformation. In 2013-14, persons engaged in agriculture in Debra CD block could be classified as follows: bargadars 6.76%, patta (document) holders 19.74%, small farmers (possessing land between 1 and 2 hectares) 3.63%, marginal farmers (possessing land up to 1 hectare) 23.33% and agricultural labourers 46.53%.

In 2005-06 the nett cropped area in Debra CD block was 29,287 hectares and the area in which more than one crop was grown was 25,376 hectares.

The extension of irrigation has played a role in growth of the predominantly agricultural economy. In 2013-14, the total area irrigated in Debra CD block was 26,730 hectares, out of which 2,200 hectares were irrigated by tank water, 23,700 hectares by deep tubewells and 830 hectares by river lift irrigation.

In 2013-14, Debra CD block produced 4,635 tonnes of Aman paddy, the main winter crop, from 5,299 hectares, 224 tonnes of Aus paddy (summer crop) from 121 hectares, 65,627 tonnes of Boro paddy (spring crop) from 18,987 hectares, 27 tonnes of wheat from 12 hectares and 135,764 tonnes of potatoes from 5,235 hectares. It also produced pulses and oilseeds.

Banking
In 2013-14, Debra CD block had offices of 14 commercial banks and 2 gramin banks.

Transport
Debra CD block has 5 ferry services and 13 originating/ terminating bus routes.

The Howrah-Kharagpur line passes through this CD block. Balichak is a station on this line.

The Dankuni-Kharagpur sector of National Highway 16 (old number NH 6) passes through this block.

Education
In 2013-14, Debra CD block had 206 primary schools with 15,473 students, 13 middle schools with 941 students, 18 high schools with 7,963 students and 21 higher secondary schools with 19,923 students. Debra CD block had 1 general college with 1,688 students, 2 technical / professional institutions with 200 students and 585 institutions for special and non-formal education with 19,938 students.

The United Nations Development Programme considers the combined primary and secondary enrolment ratio as the simple indicator of educational achievement of the children in the school going age. The infrastructure available is important. In Debra CD block out of the total 206 primary schools in 2008-2009, 76 had pucca buildings, 54 partially pucca, 6 kucha and 70 multiple type.

Debra Thana Sahid Kshudiram Smriti Mahavidyalaya is a co-educational college established in 2006 at Gangaram Chak. Affiliated to Vidyasagar University, it offers honours courses in Bengali, English, Sanskrit, history, philosophy, geography, education, physics and mathematics.

Culture
The Debra CD block has several heritage temples.

Healthcare
In 2014, Debra CD block had one superspeciality hospital, 1 rural hospital, 5 primary health centres and 14 private nursing homes with total 232 beds and 14 doctors. It had 44 family welfare sub centres and 1 family welfare centre. 5,851 patients were treated indoor and 123,807 patients were treated outdoor in the hospitals, health centres and subcentres of the CD Block.

Debra Rural Hospital, with 40 beds at Debra Bazar, is the major government medical facility in the Debra CD block. There are primary health centres at: Satyapur (PO Marotala) (with 6 beds), Pasang (with 10 beds), Trilochanpur (PO Sijgeria) (with 6 beds) and Kankra Shibrampur (PO Kankra Ataram) (with 6 beds).

References

Community development blocks in Paschim Medinipur district